Allen Jaggi (born 1944) is a member of the Wyoming House of Representatives.  He has held that position since 2007.

Jaggi was born in Logan, Utah.  He earned a bachelor's degree in education and wildlife management at Utah State University in 1968.  Prior to entering politics he was a teacher in the Lyman School District.

Jaggi is a member of the Church of Jesus Christ of Latter-day Saints.  He and his wife Jane are the parents of four children.

Sources 
 Project Vote Smart entry on Jaggi

1944 births
Latter Day Saints from Utah
Living people
Members of the Wyoming House of Representatives
Politicians from Logan, Utah
Utah State University alumni
21st-century American politicians
Latter Day Saints from Wyoming